The April 29, 1962, race at Virginia International Raceway  was the third racing event of the twelfth season of the Sports Car Club of America's 1962 Championship Racing Series.

SCCA National Virginia - Classes: AP+BP+CP

(Race Results)

References

External links
RacingSportsCars.com
World Sports Racing Prototypes
Dick Lang Racing History

President's Cup